Philippe Brinquin (born 2 June 1971 in Quimperlé) is a retired French professional football player.

Honours
Livingston
Scottish First Division: 2000–01

References

1971 births
Living people
French footballers
Ligue 2 players
FC Lorient players
Ligue 1 players
Stade Rennais F.C. players
Le Havre AC players
French expatriate footballers
Expatriate footballers in Scotland
Scottish Football League players
Scottish Premier League players
Livingston F.C. players
Association football defenders
Sportspeople from Finistère
Footballers from Brittany
Brittany international footballers